Khyongla Rato (1923 – 24 May 2022), also known as Khyongla Rato Rinpoche, Rato Khyongla Rinpoche, Khyongla Rinpoche, Ngawang Lobsang Shedrub Tenpai Dronme, and also as Nawang Losang, his monk's name, was a scholar and teacher in the Gelugpa tradition of Tibetan Buddhism. He was born in Dagyab county in Kham province in southeastern Tibet, and was recognized as an incarnate lama at an early age. He spent over thirty years of his life as a monk studying in the monasteries of Tibet and receiving teachings from many highly qualified lamas.

In 1959, after the Chinese communists took over, Khyongla Rato left Tibet, crossing the Himalayas to India. Eventually he came to Europe and then the US, and in 1968 he starting living in New York City. In 1975 he founded The Tibet Center, a center for the study of Buddhism. For over thirty years he was the director and main teacher at the Tibet Center, teaching primarily in English. As of 2014, he still taught at The Tibet Center whenever his schedule permitted. He was the senior reincarnate lama of Rato Monastery, also known as Rato Dratsang.

In 1977 Khyonlga Rato's autobiography, My Life and Lives, was published. In 1993 he appeared in the Bertolucci film, Little Buddha. In 2014 he appeared in a documentary film that was about one of his students, Nicholas Vreeland; the documentary film was Monk with a Camera.

Khyongla Rato died in Dharamsala, India, on 24 May 2022.  Shortly after Rinpoche's death, the Dalai Lama noted that a "very good friend of mine recently passed away."

Name and history
Khyongla Rinpoche was the tenth incarnation of a lama, the first Khyongla, born in 1510, who as a child was known as Jigme; later in life he became widely known for his teaching of the dharma, when people started calling him the "Lama from Khyong Yul" or "Khyongla".

Khyongla is pronounced Chungla. The name Rato is a reference to Rato Monastery, aka Rato Dratsang, where Khyongla Rato studied.

The current Khyongla Rinpoche was born in 1923, in a small village called Ophor, south of Chamdo in the Dagyab, Kham region of what was then Tibet. At the age of five, Norbu, as he was then known, was recognized as an incarnate lama, and on his sixth birthday he was taken to his labrang (a lama's residence). He became a monk and studied at Rato Monastery, later moving to Drepung Monastery, where he received his Lharampa Geshe degree (equivalent to Doctor of Divinity), and finally to Gyuto Tantric University, where he served as abbot.

In 1958, the 14th Dalai Lama was taking the examinations for his Lharampa Geshe degree. Khyongla Rato was asked to be one of two scholars who, during Monlam, would represent Rato Monastery as debating challengers in the Dalai Lama's final examination at the Jokhang. Altogether there were eighty challengers from ten monasteries. As Khyongla Rato says in his autobiography, on page 233, when it was his turn to debate, "For half an hour our thrilling interchange continued until the senior tutor, my good friend Ling Rinpoche, raised his hand and I returned to my place, exceedingly joyful and relieved."

A photographic exhibition featuring Khyongla Rinpoche, Return to the Roof of the World, was held at the Leica Gallery in New York in 2011. It follows Nicholas Vreeland's journey as a photographer while accompanying his teacher on his return to his birthplace in Dagyab, eastern Tibet, fifty years after he had left.

Teachers
Khyongla Rato Rinpoche studied with over seventy teachers, including Konchok Gyatso, Geshe Yeshe Loden, and from the age of 25 with Kyabje Ling Rinpoche, the senior tutor of the 14th Dalai Lama. While Khyongla Rinpoche was still quite young, he attended a teaching from Pabongkhapa Déchen Nyingpo, and this served as a significant inspiration to him.

Publications
While first in India, at the request of the Dalai Lama, Khyongla Rato Rinpoche helped to write texts on the grammar, literature, history and religion of Tibet; these were used in the education of the families of Tibetan exiles. In the 1970s, as a result of urging from his students, Khyongla Rato wrote an autobiography, My Life and Lives; the book focuses primarily on his years in Tibet. Joseph Campbell, the American mythologist, edited the book and wrote the introduction.

The Tibet Center

In 1975, Khyongla Rato founded and was director of The Tibet Center in New York City. The center is also known as Kunkhyab Thardo Ling (translation: Land pervaded with Seekers of Liberation), a name that was given to the center by Ling Rinpoche. Khyongla Rato taught at the Tibet Center for almost 40 years. Geshe Nicholas Vreeland, the subject of the documentary film Monk With A Camera, is the current director. Tibet Center students include Nicholas Vreeland, Richard Gere, Adam Yauch and Joseph Campbell.

Over the years many different teachers have taught at The Tibet Center, including not only high lamas from Tibetan Buddhism, but also Buddhists from the Chan, Theravadan and Zen traditions, as well as teachers from the Jain, Hindu and Christian religions, and scientists and philosophers.

Films
Despite having no prior acting experience, Khyongla Rato was asked to portray a monk in the 1993 film Little Buddha, directed by Bernardo Bertolucci, who "wanted the real thing." Khyongla Rato consulted the Dalai Lama, who told him he should go ahead and do this, so he ended up playing the role of the Abbot of a Tibetan Buddhist monastery in Bhutan.

Kyongla Rato Rinpoche has considerable screen time in the 2014 documentary Monk with a Camera, because he is the "root guru" of Nicholas Vreeland, the subject of the film.

Bibliography
 My Life and Lives: The Story of a Tibetan Incarnation, edited and with a foreword by Joseph Campbell, 1977, Rato Publications, New York ,

References

External links
An obituary: Khyongla Rato Rinpoche passes away at 100., Radio Free Asia Tibetan, May 24, 2022 
Rato Dratsang Foundation
The Tibet Center, New York City and New Jersey
His Holiness the Dalai Lama: Visits to Deyang Dratsang and Ratö Dratsang 
Photos of His Holiness the Dalai Lama's visit to Rato Dratsang 
Abbot of Rato Dratsang,Director of The Tibet Center Rato Dratsang 
Notes and an audio file from the Jamyang Buddhist Centre 
 Beyond the Dalai Lama: Profiles of Four Tibetan Lamas-in-Exile, Time, by Elizabeth Dias, July 28, 2011
The Tibet Center Official Facebook page
Atisha’s “Lamp for the Path to Enlightenment” – Ven. Khyongla Rato Rinpoche, The Meridian Trust, May 2016

1923 births
2022 deaths
Lamas from Tibet
Gelug Lamas
Gelug tulkus
Tibetan writers
Tibetan Buddhists from Tibet
American people of Tibetan descent
Rinpoches
20th-century lamas
People from Kham